Chandlai is a village in Jaipur district of Rajasthan, India.

External links 
 Chandlai on indexmundi
 Population as of 2001 census

Villages in Tonk district